Shim Chang-min (born February 18, 1988), also known by his stage name Max Changmin or simply as Max, is a South Korean singer, songwriter, actor, and a member of the pop duo TVXQ. Born and raised in Seoul, South Korea, Changmin was scouted by an SM Entertainment talent agent when he was fourteen years old. He made his debut as TVXQ's youngest member in December 2003.

Fluent in both Korean and Japanese, Changmin has achieved commercial success throughout Asia as the main vocalist  of TVXQ. He has also starred in several dramas.

Early life
Changmin was born and raised in Seoul, South Korea to a Buddhist family. He has two younger sisters and both of his parents are teachers. When he was fourteen years old, a talent scout from S.M. Entertainment spotted Changmin while he was singing and playing badminton at the same time during gym class. The scout suggested that he audition for S.M., but Changmin had no interest in becoming a singer. His mother, wanting a chance to meet BoA, urged Changmin to attend the casting auditions anyway. Three days after auditioning, S.M. called Changmin in for a second audition, which he passed. After winning the Best Singer and Best Artist award at S.M.'s 6th Annual Youth Best Contest, Changmin signed with the company.

Music career

TVXQ

The final lineup of TVXQ consisted of Changmin, U-Know Yunho, Kim Jae-joong, Park Yoo-chun, and Kim Jun-su. The group officially debuted on December 26, 2003, during a BoA and Britney Spears showcase. They performed their debut single "Hug", which became a hit in South Korea. TVXQ has been releasing number one albums in Korea since their second studio album Rising Sun (2005), which was also the album that gave the group their first Daesang (대상), or Grand Award, at the Mnet KM Music Festival. Their fourth Korean album Mirotic (2008) was the Album of the Year at the 2008 Mnet KM Music Festival and the 2008 Golden Disc Awards. The album features the group's most well-known and bestselling single, "Mirotic."

In 2005, TVXQ made their Japanese debut with the single "Stay with Me Tonight," debuting at number 37 on the Oricon Singles Chart. They grabbed their first number one single in Japan with "Purple Line" (2008). Their fourth Japanese album The Secret Code spawned two platinum-selling singles "Dōshite Kimi o Suki ni Natte Shimattandarō?" and Share the World" (2009), a theme song for the anime One Piece.

TVXQ was plunged into legal turmoil when members Jaejoong, Yoochun, and Junsu filed an injunction against their agency in July 2009. This led to their much-publicized departure from the group in 2010. A year later, Changmin and Yunho returned as a duo, releasing albums in both Korean and Japanese. As a duo, TVXQ set sales records and concert attendance records in Japan, becoming the country's bestselling and highest-grossing foreign music act.

S.M. The Ballad and solo career
In 2014, Changmin joined the ballad group S.M. the Ballad, initially formed by S.M. Entertainment in 2010. On the group's 2nd album Breath, he sang the Japanese version of the title track "Breath" with f(x)'s Krystal Jung.

2015–present: Close to You, Chocolate, Human, and Devil
Changmin released his first Japanese solo mini album Close to You on November 18, 2015, one day before his enlistment. The lead single is a ballad titled "Into the Water", among six other tracks. Bundled with a DVD that includes a music video and behind-the-scenes footage, Close to You was a limited release and was only made available for purchase to members of TVXQ's Japanese fanclub, Bigeast.

On March 13, 2020, it was reported that the TVXQ member was preparing to release a solo album. A source from SM Entertainment confirmed the news and stated, "Changmin is currently working hard, with the goal of releasing his solo album in April."

On March 23, 2020, SM Entertainment announced that Changmin would be releasing his debut mini album Chocolate on April 6. The mini-album consists of six songs of varying genres—including the title track "Chocolate" and features a collaboration with Korean singer Chungha.

Although Changmin had previously released solo songs in the past, through TVXQ's albums, contributions to soundtracks and as well as a Japanese solo mini-album, Chocolate marked Changmin's official solo debut in Korea after debuting in the band more than 16 years ago. Fellow member Yunho also released his first solo mini-album True Colors the previous year.

On December 8, 2021, Changmin released his second Japanese mini album Human.

On January 13, 2022, Changmin released his second mini album Devil.

Television and acting career
Changmin made his acting debut alongside TVXQ in the miniseries Vacation, which had a special premiere and screening at the main auditorium of Yonsei University. He also participated in a number of episodes of Banjun Drama, a popular mini series that aired on SBS network.

In 2010, Changmin had a guest role in the action thriller series Athena: Goddess of War, playing a NIS explosives specialist.

In 2011, Changmin took on his first lead role in the romantic comedy drama Paradise Ranch opposite Lee Yeon-hee. He also dubbed his own voice for the Japanese release of Paradise Ranch.

In 2012, Changmin made his big-screen debut in the Japanese film Fly With the Gold based on the novel by Takamura Kaoru. He plays Momo, a North Korean spy disguised as an engineering student. He has been praised for his fluent Osaka dialect in the film by director Izutsu Kazuyuki.  Changmin was nominated for the Newcomer Award at the prestigious 37th annual Hochi Film Awards in Japan, becoming the first Korean artist to be nominated. On January 21, 2013, it was announced that Changmin had won the Newcomer of the Year award at the 36th Japanese Academy Award.

In 2013, Changmin became a co-host alongside Kang Ho-dong for the KBS variety show Moonlight Prince. This was Changmin's first stint as a regular host. Following the end of the show in March, Changmin joined the cast of sports variety show Cool Kiz On The Block as a cast member and left in 2014.

In 2014, Changmin starred in Mnet's four-episode miniseries Mimi. He next starred in the historical fantasy drama The Scholar Who Walks The Night as Crown Prince Lee Yoon.

Artistry

Changmin is known for his high tenor register, particularly his screams and high notes. He is also active as a lyricist, and has written for several of the band's music, including 2007's "Evergreen" (Only Love), the Korean version of "Love in the Ice" (Mirotic), "Confession" (Keep Your Head Down), and "I Swear" (Catch Me).

Changmin has also written for other groups and artists; such as "Sleepless Night", a track in SHINee's third album Chapter 2. Why So Serious? – The Misconceptions of Me; and "Ace", the title track of Taemin's album Ace; as well as "My Thoughts, Your Memories", a track on Kyuhyun's album At Gwanghwamun.

Personal life 
Besides his native Korean, Changmin is fluent in Japanese. Changmin graduated from Gaepo High School in 2006 and was accepted into Kyung Hee University in 2009, majoring in postmodern music. In 2011, he pursued a second degree in Film and Arts at Konkuk University. He went on to pursue a master's degree at Inha University. He is also interested in becoming a professional photographer and is a student of photographer Kim Young-joon.

Relationship and marriage 
The singer originally had planned to marry his non-celebrity girlfriend on September 5, 2020, but the wedding was later postponed due to concerns over the COVID-19 pandemic. The couple subsequently married in a private ceremony on October 25, 2020. His wife gave birth to their first son on October 17, 2022.

Volunteer work
In January 2008, Changmin volunteered with his father in the cleanup of the beaches in Taean, South Korea following the nation's worst oil spill in history. His trip to Taean was intended to be done secretly during a short break from his activities with TVXQ during the new year and was only made known to the media and public when another volunteer posted his sighting on a fan site. The incident was later confirmed by TVXQ's agent.

Military service
On July 7, 2015, Changmin applied for the Military Police to fulfill his compulsory national service. He was inducted into the Republic of Korea Armed Forces as a conscripted policeman on November 19, 2015. Changmin received five weeks of basic training at the Chungnam Nonsan Military Training Camp and was the leader of his squad. He was honorably discharged from service on August 18, 2017.

Discography

Extended plays

Singles

Lyric credits

Filmography

Film

Television series

Musical

Travel series

Variety show

Web show

Selected awards

References

External links

 

1988 births
Japanese-language singers of South Korea
Living people
Male actors from Seoul
Singers from Seoul
SM Entertainment artists
South Korean male idols
South Korean male film actors
South Korean male television actors
South Korean pop singers
South Korean male singers
South Korean Buddhists
South Korean singer-songwriters
TVXQ members
Konkuk University alumni
South Korean child singers
South Korean male singer-songwriters
South Korean tenors